All the Best! is the second official compilation album of Paul McCartney's music, after 1978's Wings Greatest. It was released in 1987 on Capitol Records and Parlophone Records.

Background
The album contains tracks from the beginning of his solo career in 1970 up to (on editions outside the United States) the newly recorded "Once Upon a Long Ago". The American version has a different track listing, reflecting the popularity of particular songs there. Originally the album was to include the unreleased London Town track "Waterspout"; there are LP slicks that feature it as the opening track on side two, as well as a cartoon icon, but the song was omitted at the last minute.

Editions outside the United States have 20 tracks on the vinyl version and 17 on CD; the CD omits "Maybe I'm Amazed", "With A Little Luck" and "Goodnight Tonight". The American edition has 17 tracks on both vinyl and CD, and omits "Pipes of Peace",  "Maybe I'm Amazed", "Once Upon A Long Ago", "We All Stand Together", and "Mull Of Kintyre", but adds "Junior’s Farm" and "Uncle Albert/Admiral Halsey". It also substitutes the studio version of "Coming Up" for an edit of the live version, and has a shorter version of "With A Little Luck".

Issued just as McCartney was beginning work on his next studio album, All the Best! was a commercial success in the UK, where it reached number 2 (having been kept off the top position by George Michael's debut solo album, Faith). In America, the compilation peaked at number 62, although it was eventually certified double platinum there.

Track listings

UK/Australian/Canadian/Japanese listing

US track listing

Charts

Chart positions

Certifications

Notes 

1987 greatest hits albums
Albums produced by Paul McCartney
Albums produced by George Martin
Albums produced by Phil Ramone
Paul McCartney compilation albums
Parlophone compilation albums